Mixed Bag is the debut studio album by Richie Havens and was released in 1966. Although it was Havens' first album release, Douglas Records later issued two unauthorized albums of material that had been recorded prior to the Mixed Bag recording sessions—Electric Havens (1968) and Richie Havens' Record (1969). Mixed Bag was released after Havens signed on with manager Albert Grossman and was released on Verve Folkways, a new folk music imprint of Verve Records.

Mixed Bag is frequently cited as the singer's best work, and was his first album to appear on Billboard's charts (appearing on both the jazz and pop charts). The recording was the first to introduce a wider audience to Havens's rich baritone vocals and the full-sound of Havens's distinct guitar style (thumb-chorded and played in open E tuning). Electric Havens and Mixed Bag were two of the records reported among the personal collection of Havens' one-time Greenwich Village buddy, Jimi Hendrix.

Track listing 
 "High Flyin' Bird" (Billy Edd Wheeler) – 3:35 
 "I Can't Make It Anymore" (Gordon Lightfoot) – 2:48 
 "Morning, Morning" (Tuli Kupferberg) – 2:17 
 "Adam" (Havens) – 3:34 
 "Follow" (Jerry Merrick) – 6:22 
 "Three Day Eternity" (Havens) – 2:15 
 "Sandy" (Jean Pierre Cousineau) – 3:12 
 "Handsome Johnny" (Louis Gossett Jr., Havens) – 3:53 
 "San Francisco Bay Blues" (Jesse Fuller) – 2:30 
 "Just Like a Woman" (Bob Dylan) – 4:46 
 "Eleanor Rigby" (John Lennon, Paul McCartney) – 2:42

Personnel
 Richie Havens – guitar, sitar, vocals
 Harvey Brooks – bass 
 Paul Harris – organ, piano, keyboards
 Bill LaVorgna – drums
 Howard Collins – guitar
 Joe Price – tabla on "Adam"
 Paul "Dino" Williams – acoustic guitar on "Follow"
Technical
 Cover photo – Barry Feinstein
 Director of engineering – Val Valentin 
 Produced by Groscourt Productions, Inc.
 Production Supervisor – Jerry Schoenbaum
 Arranged by Bruce Langhorne for "I Can't Make It Anymore" 
 Arranged by Felix Pappalardi for "Morning, Morning" 
 Mastered for Compact Disc by Dennis M. Drake at PolyGram Studios

Charts

Releases 
The album was initially released on vinyl in 1966 on Verve Folkways, a newly formed folk section at the Verve division of MGM Records. It was re-released as a CD in 1993 on PolyGram Records. In 2004, Mixed Bag was combined with two other Havens albums on a double CD titled Flyin' Bird: The Verve Forecast Years, a limited-edition release of 3,000 individually numbered copies.

Notes and sources 

1966 debut albums
Richie Havens albums
Verve Records albums